Bockus is a surname. Notable people with the surname include:

Kathy Bockus, Canadian politician
Randy Bockus (born 1960), American baseball player